The initials TSST may refer to:
 "Tsst", an episode of the tenth season of South Park
 Toshiba Samsung Storage Technology
 Toxic shock syndrome toxin
 Trier Social Stress Test